Chris Knowings (born February 25, 1980) is an American actor and twin brother of actress Christy Knowings. He is best known for playing Lamar Carlos Johnson in the short-lived Nickelodeon series, Taina, and Chris Robinson on the PBS Kids Show Sesame Street.

Early life
Knowings was born on February 25, 1980, in the Bronx, New York City. He attended Brooklyn Technical High School in Brooklyn, New York and studied electrical engineering.

Career

Knowings began his acting career at age 13 when he appeared in Crooklyn from Spike Lee in 1994 as Nate Carmichael, one of the main characters of the film. He portrayed Lamar Johnson in the 2001 Nickelodeon series, Taina. Other TV credits include guest appearances on Law & Order, New York Undercover, and 100 Centre Street. He also appeared in an AT&T wireless phone commercial in December 2002.

He is best known for joining the cast of Sesame Street in Season 38 in August 2007 as Chris Robinson. He received Daytime Emmy Award nominations for Outstanding Performer in a Children's Series in 2009 and 2010. In addition to Chris Robinson, Knowings has also performed voice roles on Sesame Street including the off-screen narrator of some Two-Headed Monster sketches.

Filmography
House of the Other Companies (2023) TV Series ... Chris Robinson (Guest Star)
Nature Cat (2018–present) TV Series .... Ronald (Season 2-onwards)
Kevin Can Wait (2018) TV series .... Omar (1 Episode)  
The Cookie Thief (2015) TV special .... Chris Robinson  
Sesame Street (2007–present) TV series .... Chris Robinson
LazyTown (5 episodes/2007) TV Series....Pixel
Generation Jets (2003) TV series .... XL's Brother (voice)
The Nick Cannon Show (2002) .... Himself
Taina (2001-2002) .... Lamar Carlos Johnson
100 Centre Street (2001) .... Earnest Charles Glass
Law & Order (2001) .... Student Council President Brian Ander
New York Undercover (1994) .... Tyndell Jacobs
Crooklyn (1994) ... Nate Carmichael

References

External links

African-American male actors
American male child actors
American male film actors
American male television actors
Living people
Male actors from New York City
American twins
People from the Bronx
1980 births
21st-century African-American people
20th-century African-American people